The Lords of Chaos is a magazine that was published by Nicolai Shapero from 1977 to 1981.

Contents
The Lords of Chaos focused on Dungeons & Dragons.

Reviews
Dragon #50

References

Dungeons & Dragons magazines
Magazines established in 1977
Magazines disestablished in 1981
Defunct magazines published in the United States